Gabriela Lašková (née Kratochvílová; born 11 February 1990) is a Czech model and anchor who was crowned Czech Miss 2013 and represented Czech Republic at Miss Universe 2013. From 2014 to 2023 she was an anchor of the main news program on the Czech TV station Prima.

Miss Universe Czech Republic 
The ninth edition of the Czech Miss beauty contest was held on 23 March 2013 at the Karlín Musical Theatre. Throughout the evening ten finalists performed in traditional disciplines such as a swimsuit walk, but also in non-traditional disciplines of the competition that they had performed during a camp in the Philippines.

References

1990 births
Living people
Czech beauty pageant winners
Miss Universe 2013 contestants
Czech female models
People from Chotěboř
Czech television presenters
Czech women television presenters